Denis Mack Smith CBE FBA FRSL (3 March 1920 – 11 July 2017) was an English historian who specialized in the history of Italy from the Risorgimento onwards.  He is best known for his biographies of Garibaldi, Cavour and Mussolini, and for his single-volume Modern Italy: A Political History. He was named Grand Official of the Order of Merit of the Italian Republic in 1996.

Early life
Denis Mack Smith was born in Hampstead (north London), the son of tax inspector Wilfrid Mack Smith (1891–1975) and Altiora Edith Gauntlett (1888–1969), and was educated at St Paul's Cathedral Choir School and Haileybury College, where Martin Wight was one of his tutors. He earned a degree in History at Peterhouse, Cambridge, and following his graduation, he was a fellow there for the next 15 years (1947–62).

Career
A Senior Research Fellow at All Souls College, Oxford from 1962 to 1987, and then an Emeritus Fellow until his death, Mack Smith has been considered the world's leading scholar on Italian history for the English world.  
He belonged to the post-World War II generation of Cambridge historians, many based at Peterhouse, who learned to appreciate the primacy of documentary evidence. He was an Honorary Fellow of Wolfson College, Oxford, and of Peterhouse, Cambridge.  He received the Presidential Medal of Italy in 1984.

Though his work on Italian history has been criticized by Italian academics, including Rosario Romeo and Renzo De Felice, since their first translations were published in the 1950s, Mack Smith remains the second best-selling author on Italian history after Indro Montanelli. Other Italian academics were outraged over Mack Smith's refusal "to regard Italian fascism and the rise of Benito Mussolini as an aberration". Mack Smith contended that one of the causes of Italian fascism was the structural weaknesses that existed in the Italian political system, a lasting "legacy of the Risorgimento".

Bibliography 
 Cavour and Garibaldi, 1860: A Study in Political Conflict, 1954.
 Garibaldi: A Great Life in Brief, 1956.
 Italy: A Modern History, 1958, revised 1969, completely revised and reprinted as Modern Italy: A Political History, 1997.
 A History of Sicily, with Moses Finley, in two volumes, Medieval Sicily 800-1713 and Modern Sicily after 1713, 1968; abridged and reprinted as the single volume A History of Sicily with Moses Finley and Christopher Duggan, 1986.
 The Making of Italy, 1796-1870, 1968 (editor), reprinted as The Making of Italy, 1796-1866, 1988.
 Great Lives Observed: Garibaldi, 1969 (editor).
 Victor Emmanuel, Cavour and the Risorgimento, 1971.
 Vittorio Emanuele II, 1975.
 Mussolini's Roman Empire (Le guerre del Duce), 1976.
 Mussolini, 1981.  
 Cavour, 1985.
 Il Risorgimento italiano. Storia e testi, 1987.
 Italy and Its Monarchy, 1989. 
 Mazzini, 1994.  
 La storia manipolata, 1998.

With others
John Anthony Davis and Paul Ginsborg, eds. Society and Politics in the Age of the Risorgimento: Essays in Honour of Denis Mack Smith. (Ten essays, including "Francesco De Sanctis: the politics of a literary critic," by Denis Mack Smith.) Cambridge: Cambridge University Press, 2002.

References

Further reading 
 The Art of Denis Mack Smith, Jonathan Steinberg, London Review of Books, 23 May 1985
 The Great Pretender, A.J.P. Taylor, The New York Review of Books, 5 August 1976
 Society and Politics in the Age of the Risorgimento: Essays in honour of Denis Mack Smith, John A. Davis & Paul Ginsborg (eds.), Cambridge University Press, 1991
 
 
 

1920 births
2017 deaths
English historians
Historians of Italy
Historians of Sicily
Commanders of the Order of the British Empire
Alumni of Peterhouse, Cambridge
Fellows of Peterhouse, Cambridge
Fellows of All Souls College, Oxford
Fellows of Wolfson College, Oxford
Fellows of the Royal Society of Literature
Fellows of the British Academy
Fellows of the American Academy of Arts and Sciences